Little Bull Lake is a lake in Sudbury District, Ontario, Canada. The primary outflow is an unnamed creek to Bull Lake. Little Bull Lake is part of the drainage basin of the Yorston River, which flows into the Sturgeon River.

References

Lakes of Sudbury District